Owen Kaposa (born 26 August 1983) is a retired Zambian football midfielder.

References

1983 births
Living people
Zambian footballers
Zambia international footballers
Young Arrows F.C. players
ZESCO United F.C. players
Forest Rangers F.C. players
Association football midfielders